João Miguel Afonso Fernandes (born 2 July 1983) is a Portuguese football player who plays for Montalegre.

Club career
He made his professional debut in the Segunda Liga for Chaves on 26 September 2004 in a game against Leixões.

References

1983 births
People from Chaves, Portugal
Living people
Portuguese footballers
G.D. Chaves players
Liga Portugal 2 players
C.D. Feirense players
Gondomar S.C. players
Juventude de Pedras Salgadas players
SC Mirandela players
C.D.C. Montalegre players
Association football midfielders
Sportspeople from Vila Real District